Alexa Davalos Dunas (born May 28, 1982) is an American actress. Her early role as Gwen Raiden on the fourth season of the TV series Angel (2002–03) was followed by some Hollywood films, including The Chronicles of Riddick (2004), Feast of Love (2007), The Mist (2007), Defiance (2008) and Clash of the Titans (2010). She has also appeared on the television series Reunion (2005–06) and in Frank Darabont's Mob City (2013). She starred as Juliana Crain, the main character in the Amazon Studios series The Man in the High Castle (2015–2019). She also plays Special Agent Kristin Gaines in the CBS drama series FBI: Most Wanted (2021–present).

Early life
Davalos was born in Paris, France to American parents, photographer Jeff Dunas and actress Elyssa Davalos, daughter of actor Richard Davalos. Davalos spent most of her childhood in France and Italy, before settling in New York. She has stated "I tend to curse in French more often than I do in English."

She is of Spanish and Finnish descent on her mother's side. Her father's family is Jewish (her paternal ancestors lived in Vilnius in Lithuania). She was raised "without much religion", though she attended Hebrew school for a time.

Davalos struck out on her own at seventeen and moved to New York City. She supported herself by modeling for photographers like Peter Lindbergh. "I had a mission," she recalls. "I wanted to be out in the world, doing my own thing. Working in a theatre, I discovered that I really wanted to act." Her passion soon grew towards acting, and she attended the Off-Broadway Flea Theater in New York. She kept her acting plans from her family until her career started to take off.

Career
In 2002, Davalos co-starred with Charlie Hofheimer in the short film The Ghost of F. Scott Fitzgerald, which screened at the 2002 Toronto International Film Festival. In September 2003, she was seen opposite Antonio Banderas in the HBO film And Starring Pancho Villa as Himself. Davalos made her feature film debut in 2004 starring in The Chronicles of Riddick as Jack / Kyra.

Davalos also appeared as the superhuman Gwen Raiden in three episodes of the TV show Angel and in 2005 co-starred in the Fox show Reunion. In 2007, she was featured in the romantic drama Feast of Love, which starred Greg Kinnear and Morgan Freeman. She also played Sally in The Mist (directed by Frank Darabont), co-starring Thomas Jane, Laurie Holden and Marcia Gay Harden.

In 2008, Davalos co-starred as the love interest of Daniel Craig in the war film Defiance, directed by Edward Zwick. She played Andromeda in the remake of Clash of the Titans, alongside Sam Worthington, Ralph Fiennes and Liam Neeson. She did not return for the 2012 sequel, Wrath of the Titans, due to a scheduling conflict.

In 2013, she reunited again with Frank Darabont playing the female lead on the television series Mob City. 2 years later, in 2015, she starred in The Man in the High Castle (2015–2019).

In 2019, she has made a brief appearance in The Punisher, along with star Jon Bernthal; both of whom were also in Mob City (2013).

Personal life
Davalos is a close friend of actresses Amanda Righetti and Chyler Leigh, and was Righetti's bridesmaid at her wedding. Davalos considers herself to be a "dork" and loves to travel and read. She guards her private life stating, "I think it's a choice. I think it's a conscious choice, and what you allow to affect you and what you don't."

Davalos married actor Josh Stewart on May 19, 2019. Both were costars on the second season of the Netflix series The Punisher.

She is a stepmother to Stewart’s 2 children from his previous marriage

Filmography

Film

Television

References

External links
 
Alexa Davalos  on SML 

Actresses from New York City
American film actresses
American people of Lithuanian-Jewish descent
American expatriates in France
American television actresses
Jewish American actresses
Living people
21st-century American actresses
American people of Finnish descent
American people of Spanish descent
American expatriates in Italy
21st-century American Jews
1982 births